The 2017–18 Azerbaijan First Division  is the second-level of football in Azerbaijan. Turan Tovuz were the defending champions.

Teams
Sabail was promoted from the 2016–17 season to Azerbaijan Premier League, while Shuvalan relegated to the First Division. On 25 September 2017, it was announced that Bine, Khazar Baku, and Sabah will participate in the First Division.

Shamkir, Shahdag, Sharurspor, Energetik, Bakılı, Ravan Baku and Göyazan didn't participate in this season.

Personnel and kits

Note: Flags indicate national team as has been defined under FIFA eligibility rules. Players may hold more than one non-FIFA nationality.

Table

Season statistics

Scoring
 First goal of the season: Vigar Alibabayev for Mil-Muğan against Khazar Baku. (3 October 2017)

Top scorers

Hat-tricks

References

External links
 pfl.az
 AFFA 

Azerbaijan First Division seasons
Azerbaijan First Division
2